Abegong is a village in the Kachin State of far north-east Myanmar. It is located near the border with Yunnan, China.

Demographics of Kachin State
The majority of the state's 1.2 million inhabitants are ethnic Kachin, also known as Jinghpaw. The state is home to other ethnic groups including the Rawang, Lisu, Zaiwa, Lawngwaw, Lachik, Bamar, Shan, and a small number of Tibetans. Christianity (Protestant and Roman Catholic) is the main religion in Kachin State. The Kachin language is the state's lingua franca.

See also
List of cities, towns and villages in Burma: A

External links
MSN Encarta map
Satellite map at Maplandia.com

Populated places in Kachin State